Laurie Morgan (17 December 1930 – 18 January 2018) was a Deputy of the States of Guernsey. He was Guernsey's first Chief Minister and was elected to the post in May 2004. His term of office was due to expire in 2008, when the next General Election was due. It was announced on 31 January 2007 that the Chief Minister and the Policy Council were to resign.

Morgan was born in London in 1930. He was first elected as a Deputy on 29 June 1988, and then went on to serve as a Conseiller until the post was abolished in 2000. He was re-elected as a Deputy for St. Peter Port in 2000. In 2004, the electoral districts were redefined and Morgan was re-elected to represent the electoral district of St. Peter Port South.

His wife, Wendy Morgan, serves as a Deputy for St. Peter Port North and as Deputy Minister for Education.

On 5 March 2007, Deputy Mike Torode was elected to succeed Laurie Morgan as Chief Minister.

References

1930 births
2018 deaths
Government ministers of Guernsey
Members of the States of Guernsey